We Are The Champ is the debut album by The Loungs, released on 21 May 2007 on the Akoustik Anarkhy label. It was recorded and produced by The Loungs and Andy Bowes at Catalyst Studios, St. Helens. It features re-recorded versions of both sides of the band's debut single (I'm Gonna Take Your Girl/Seen My Baby Dancing), and the lead tracks from their second (Armageddon Outta Here) and third (Googly Moogly).

The album was released on 12" Vinyl, CD Digipack and download. The download was available ahead of the physical release – from 23 April.

Track listing
 Clancy's Stomp
 Electric Lights
 Armageddon Outta Here
 Smile Reptile
 Throughout It All
 Googly Moogly
 Get Along
 I'm Gonna Take Your Girl
 Leep
 Dig That Do
 All Your Love
 Seen My Baby Dancing
 In Winter Coats

Additional musicians
 Paul Brennan – Trombone
 David Geoghegan – Trumpet
 Paul Swannell – Violin and string arrangement
 Esther DeJong – Violin
 Alex Fletcher – Viola
 Aileen Williams – Cello

External links
Official Website
Album myspace page
Recording diary
Akoustik Anarkhy website
St. Helens Music

2007 albums